Abel Prescott Jr. (December 12, 1749September 21, 1775) was one of the Americans who rode to warn that the British soldiers were coming to Concord, Massachusetts on the eve of the American Revolution. Born in Concord, Massachusetts, he was the fourth child of Abel Prescott and Abigail (Brigham) Prescott. He never married and died from dysentery at the age of 26 years.

While his brother Samuel Prescott was warning Concord about the British march to Concord, Abel rode south to warn the towns of Sudbury and Framingham. He was fired on by British soldiers as he was returning from the neighboring town. He was slightly wounded in his side but succeeded in escaping by hiding himself in a house belonging to Mrs. Heywood.

References

External links
 The Tale of Two Families Joined by Love, Shattered by War

1749 births
1775 deaths
People of Massachusetts in the American Revolution
People from Concord, Massachusetts
People of colonial Massachusetts
Burials in Massachusetts
Deaths from dysentery